Sisters of St. Francis may refer to:

 Sisters of St. Francis of Assisi, a Roman Catholic religious congregation for women founded in 1849 in St. Francis, Wisconsin, U.S.
 Sisters of St. Francis Health Services, Inc., now named Franciscan Alliance, Inc., a healthcare system in Indiana and Illinois, U.S.
 Sisters of St. Francis of the Holy Cross, a diocesan community of religious women founded in 1868 in northeastern Wisconsin, U.S.
 Sisters of St. Francis of the Martyr St. George, a Roman Catholic Congregation of consecrated women founded in 1869 in Thuine, Germany
 Sisters of St. Francis of Perpetual Adoration, a papal congregation of the Roman Catholic Church, founded in 1863 in Olpe, Germany
 Sisters of Saint Francis of Rochester, Minnesota, a Roman Catholic religious congregation for women founded in 1877 in the Diocese of Winona
 Sisters of St. Francis, any of a number of other religious congregations that are part of the Third Order of Saint Francis, a third order within the Franciscan movement of the Catholic Church
 School Sisters of St. Francis, an international religious congregation of Catholic Sisters founded in 1874 in New Cassel, Wisconsin, U.S.
 Sisters of St. Francis of Maryville, a former Roman Catholic religious congregation for women based in Maryville, Missouri, U.S., founded in 1894 and ended in 1985
 Sisters of St. Francis of Penance and Christian Charity, a Roman Catholic religious congregation for women founded in 1835 in Heythuysen, the Netherlands
 Sisters of St. Joseph of the Third Order of St. Francis, a Roman Catholic Franciscan religious congregation for women established in 1901 in Stevens Point, Wisconsin, U.S.
 Tertiary Sisters of St. Francis – Cameroon, the African Province of a congregation of Roman Catholic Religious Sisters founded in 1700 in Brixen, Italy
 Bernardine Sisters of St. Francis, a Roman Catholic apostolic congregation of pontifical right founded in 1894, based in Reading, Pennsylvania, U.S.
 Oblate Sisters of St. Francis de Sales, a congregation of Roman Catholic Religious Sisters established in 1866 in Troyes, France
 Poor Sisters of St. Francis, a religious congregation founded in 1845 in Germany

See also
 Franciscan Sisters (disambiguation)